Heilongjiang University of Technology, formerly named Jixi University, is a provincial university in Jixi, Heilongjiang Province. Founded in 1958.

History
In 2013, Jixi University was renamed as Heilongjiang University of Technology.

References

External links
Heilongjiang University of Technology 

Universities and colleges in Heilongjiang
Technical universities and colleges in China